This article lists political parties in Crimea.

In parliament
Parties represented in the State Council of Crimea:
 United Russia
 Liberal Democratic Party of Russia
 Communist Party of the Russian Federation

Other parties

Defunct parties
 Milliy Firqa
 Republican Party of Crimea
 Electoral Bloc of Kunitsyn
 For Yanukovych!
 Russian Bloc
 Qurultai-Rukh
 Soyuz